Camillo Rusconi (14 July 1658 – 8 December 1728) was an Italian sculptor of the late Baroque in Rome. His style displays both features of Baroque and Neoclassicism. He has been described as a Carlo Maratta in marble.

Biography
Initially trained in his hometown of Milan with Giuseppe Rusnati. By 1685-1686, he had moved to Rome and into the studio of Ercole Ferrata, who died within a year or two of his arrival. Rusconi's talent attracted commissions, for example, for plaster allegorical statues depicting four virtues (prudence, justice, temperance, and strength) for the Ludovisi chapel in the church of Sant'Ignazio. He then worked alongside Le Gros in sculpting angels for the tympanum of the altar of Saint Ignatius at the Church of the Gesù.

Camillo’s masterpieces are the four larger-than-life apostles (Matthew, James the Great, Andrew, and John) completed during 1708-1718 for the niches of the Archbasilica of St. John Lateran (San Giovanni in Laterano).
This sculptural program was the major such project in the Rome of his day. The other main sculptors for the project, Le Gros and Pierre-Etienne Monnot, each only garnered two apostles. Pope Clement XI had established a committee to select the artists, and included Carlo Fontana and Rusconi's friend, Carlo Maratta, in the panel. The classical restraint of the figures was to set a trend toward neoclassicism.

Other works include some of the architectural decoration for San Silvestro in Capite, San Salvatore in Lauro, and for the Chiesa Nuova (Santa Maria in Vallicella).  He also completed the tomb of  Pope Gregory XIII (1715–1723) for the St. Peter's; the tomb of Bartolomeo Corsino in San Giovanni in Laterano, and of the principe Alessandro Sobieski in the church of Santa Maria della Concezione. He also complete the portrait of Giulia Albani degli Olivieri, the powerful aunt of Clement XI, (presently in the Kunsthistorisches Museum, Vienna).  His tomb for Caesar Fabretti (? -1700) is on the first pillar to the left in the church of Santa Maria sopra Minerva.

Among his pupils were Pietro Bracci, Giovanni Battista Maini, and Filippo della Valle. In 1727, he was named principe of the Accademia di San Luca.

References

1658 births
1728 deaths
Artists from Milan
17th-century Italian sculptors
Italian male sculptors
Italian Baroque sculptors
18th-century Italian sculptors
Catholic sculptors
18th-century Italian male artists